The Enid A. Haupt Garden is a 4.2 acre public garden in the Smithsonian complex, adjacent to the Smithsonian Institution Building (the "Castle") on the National Mall in Washington, D.C.  It was designed to be a modern representation of American Victorian gardens as they appeared in the mid to late 19th century.  It replaced an existing Victorian Garden which had been built to celebrate the nation's Bicentennial in 1976.

History

The garden opened on May 21, 1987, as part of the redesigned Castle quadrangle.   It is named for Enid A. Haupt, who provided the $3 million endowment which financed its construction and maintenance. Initially approached with a request that she finance a small Zen garden within the quadrangle, after a review of the plans Haupt said that she was "not interested in putting money into a Zen garden...I'm only interested in financing the whole thing."

The quadrangle redesign project and the Smithsonian Gardens more broadly were part of the vision of the eighth Secretary of the Smithsonian, S. Dillon Ripley, who felt that the museum experience should extend beyond the museums' buildings into the outdoor spaces.

The landscape design of the garden featured the collaborative efforts of architect Jean Paul Carlhian, principal in the Boston firm of Shepley, Bulfinch, Richardson and Abbott; Lester Collins; Sasaki Associates Inc. of Watertown, Massachusetts; and James R. Buckler, founding director of the Smithsonian's Office of Horticulture.

The central feature of the garden is a symmetrically patterned parterre, flanked by the Moongate Garden to the west and the Fountain Garden to the east.  The parterre measures 144 feet long by 66 feet wide; the low-growing plants that fill out the series of diamonds, fleurs-de-lis, and scallops or swags that make up the design are changed every six months, typically in September and May.

Other notable design features include saucer and tulip magnolias, brick walkways, and historical cast-iron garden furnishings from the Smithsonian Gardens' Garden Furniture Collection. The Andrew Jackson Downing Urn is within a circle in the northeast portion of the parterre.

Gallery

References

External links
 Official Website

Gardens in Washington, D.C.
National Mall
Smithsonian Institution
Landscape design history of the United States
Southwest Federal Center